Echo Is Your Love is a Finnish noise rock band. It was founded in 1998, when Mikko Heikkonen and Ilai Rämä got acquainted with each other. The first gig was played after one rehearsal with the whole band.

The first tour abroad was made in 2001. The band toured a lot until recent years, including Britain, Russia and elsewhere in Europe and the United States. The band has released all its albums with the If Society label.

Recordings

Albums 
 Sheets of Blank Fucking Paper (2000)
 8 hours (2002)
 Paper Cut Eye (2004)
 Humansize (2006)
 Heart Fake (2010)

Singles and EP's
 Saw Them Play Like Ghosts (7-inch, 1998)
 Echo Is Your Love / Kemialliset ystävät (split 12-inch, 1999)
 Echo Is Your Love / Warser Gate (split 7-inch, 1999)
 Frustration / Tired of My Eyes (7-inch, 2000)
 Echo Is Your Love / Electroscope (split 7-inch, 2000)
 Lion Tamer vs Tigers (2008)
 DNA / Six-Month Night (2016)

References

External links
 Echo Is Your Love website

Finnish musical groups
Finnish rock music groups
Finnish noise rock groups
Musical groups established in 1998